Nabua, officially the Municipality of Nabua (Rinconada Bikol: Banwāan ka Nabua; Tagalog: Bayan ng Nabua), is a 1st class municipality in the province of Camarines Sur, Philippines. According to the 2020 census, it has a population of 86,490 people.

Nabua is the mother town of Iriga City, Buhi, Bato, Balatan, Bula and Baao in Camarines Sur.  Nabua has five districts: Antacudos, Binoyoan, Caobnan, Lupa and Sabang.

Nabua is home of the modern kuntaw, and jota rojana.

Past Mayors
Atty. Fernando "Fer" Simbulan | 2007-2010, 2019–2022, 2022-present

Delia "Del" Castro-Simbulan | 2010-2013, 2013-2016, 2016–2019

Etymology
The Municipality of Nabua traces the historical origin of its name way back during the Spanish Colonization. It was said that in 1571, an Augustinian Friar named Fray Alonzo Gimenez reached one of the rancherias called "Lupa" which was then under Datu Panga from Borneo.  The good friar found persons inside the said rancheria cutting coconuts.  He was offered to partake the inside shoot of coconut which the natives called “boa." Immediately, Fray Alonzo tagged the place as “Nabua” pronounced with his Spanish Accent. From that time onward, this place become popularly known as "Nabua."

In another version, a historian named Fray Felix Huerta claimed that the name came from the story that the original sitio of the town is in the shape a young coconut embryo which was surrounded by five rancherias named Lupa, Antacodos, Sabang, Caobnan, and Binoyoan. Other believed otherwise and said it was centrally located in the middle of said rancherias, thus closely resembling "boa."  For a time, the town was called “Nabobowa" but years of long usage shortened and corrupted it to the present name.

History

In 1578, a group of Franciscan missionaries led by Fray Pablo de Jesus and Fray Bartolome Ruiz put up a church in Antacodos where they placed a big cross.  These missionaries soon merged the villages of Lupa, Antacodos, Sabang, and Binoyoan into one place.

In a research mission to Spain funded by the municipality, it was learned that Nabua was officially established as a municipality on July 25, 1569.

Based on the 1734 Murillo-Velarde map, one of the earliest cartographic maps of the Philippine archipelago, the town is identified as "Nava" - a Spanish name indicating a "level piece of ground." This is probably the apt description of the place at that time, and until the present time, a flat terrain stretching from the shores of the lakes of Bato and Baao and nestled in the plains between Mt. Asog and the mountains of Bula and the then Pantao.

Geography
The municipality of Nabua ranges approximately 123.25–123.39° east longitude and 13.35–13.42° north latitude. It is bounded on the north by the municipality of Baao and Bula; on the south by the municipality of Bato; on the east by Iriga City; and on the west by the municipality of Balatan. The municipality is an established growth center in the southeast part of Camarines Sur or the midsection of Bicol River Basin Area. It is located along the Legazpi-Iriga-Naga-Daet Growth Corridor or LINDGC.

Climate

The municipality of Nabua possesses a climate belonging to the 4th type wherein rainfalls are more or less evenly distributed throughout the years. Its rainfall is classified as Type B or humid which is characterized by rains well or evenly distributed throughout the year with at most three dry months. General wind direction prevailing the municipality is from northeast to southwest at an average velocity of eight knots.

The municipality has a dry, a cold, and a wet season.  From June to November, the town experiences heavy rains. The cold season comes every December to February.  Then, from March to May, the dry season commences.

Land

The municipality of Nabua is one land mass containing a total land area of 8,854.4193 hectares. This total land area distributed among the 42 barangays, nine of which are considered as urban barangays, namely, San Antonio (Poblacion), San Esteban, San Francisco, San Juan, San Luis, San Isidro, San Miguel, San Nicolas, San Roque (Poblacion) and 33 are considered as rural barangays. Among the urban barangays, San Antonio (Poblacion) has the biggest land area of 234.1798 hectares while San Luis has the least land area of 2.1746 hectares. In the rural barangays, La Purisima has the largest land area as well as in the entire municipality of 428.1501 hectares while San Roque Madawon has the smallest land area of 76.3228 hectares.

The municipality of Nabua given its land mass is entirely classified as alienable and disposable lands. Previous land classification has its slight share of forestland but was absorbed by the adjacent municipality of Balatan which requires political solution.

Elevation and slope

Nabua has about 8,803.0600 hectares or 99.42% very low elevation or less than 100 meters elevation and remaining 51.3593 hectares or 0.58% of low elevation or between 100 and 300 meters elevation. Its slope covers about 7,927.3616 hectares or 89.53% which are level to nearly level (0-3%) while the remaining 927.0577 hectares or 10.47% are rolling to moderately steep (18-30%)

As the dominantly alluvial plain, the municipality of Nabua has the prevalent soil types classified as either clay loam or sandy loam having silty texture. These soil types are very favorable for agricultural usage.

The geological characteristics for Nabua consist of: Upper Pleistocene (Sandstone and shale), Pliocene Pleistocene (Volcanoclast alluvial fans), and Recent (Alluvium or rice terraces).

The natural drainage tributaries for Nabua consist of numerous creeks interconnected with the three major rivers namely: Bicol River, Waras River, and Barit River.

Barangays

Nabua has 42 barangays:

 Angustia (Angustia Inapatan)
 Antipolo Old
 Antipolo Young
 Aro-aldao
 Bustrac
 Inapatan (Del Rosario Inapatan)
 Dolorosa (Dolorosa Inapatan)
 Duran (Jesus Duran)
 La Purisima (Agupit)
 Lourdes Old
 Lourdes Young
 La Opinion
 Paloyon Oriental
 Paloyon (Sagrada Paloyon)
 Salvacion Que Gatos
 San Antonio (Poblacion)
 San Antonio Ogbon
 San Esteban (Poblacion)
 San Francisco (Poblacion)
 San Isidro (Poblacion)
 San Isidro Inapatan
 Malawag (San Jose Malawag)
 San Jose (San Jose Pangaraon)
 San Juan (Poblacion)
 San Luis (Poblacion)
 San Miguel (Poblacion)
 San Nicolas (Poblacion)
 San Roque (Poblacion)
 San Roque Madawon
 San Roque Sagumay
 San Vicente Gorong-Gorong
 San Vicente Ogbon
 Santa Barbara (Maliban)
 Santa Cruz
 Santa Elena Baras
 Santa Lucia Baras
 Santiago Old
 Santiago Young
 Santo Domingo
 Tandaay
 Topas Proper
 Topas Sogod

Demographics

The municipality's total population accounts for 4.3% of the total provincial population of Camarines Sur, ranking sixth behind much larger population sizes of Naga, Iriga, Libmanan, Pili and Calabanga.

Historically, the municipal population has experienced positive growth rate, beginning in Censal Year 1903 up to 1999. Municipal population records show only one exception in Censal Year 1970 where the municipal population decreased. This population shift in number can be attributed to migration patterns due to socio-economic reasons. Thus, from a mere population size of 18,893 in 1903, the current municipal population more than tripled in size for 1999.

Spread out among the 42 barangays of Nabua, there are 10,093 persons living in the urban barangays while 65,329 persons live in the rural barangays. Among urban barangays, San Antonio Poblacion has the largest population with 2,363 persons while San Luis has the smallest with 358 persons.  For rural barangays, La Purisima has the largest population with 8,165 persons while Salvacion Que Gatos has the lowest with a population of 523 persons.

Religion

Many Nabueños are followers of Catholicism which is very apparent to the names of several barangays which bear the names of Catholic patron saints. However, culture, festivals and practices are of mixed Catholic and local beliefs of Bicolanos of pre-Spanish period. Iglesia ni Cristo on the other hand is the largest minority religion with several local congregations in the municipality and is growing rapidly.

Language

The Nabua-Balatan variant under lowland dialect (sinaranəw) of Rinconada Bikol can be considered having its base from the Bikol languages. However, there are other smaller social groups within the Bicol region where Nabua derives the foundation of its variant. The Rinconada area composed of Baao, Buhi, Bula, Balatan, Bato, Nabua and Iriga shares the same Rinconada Bikol language that the local folks are still enriching up to this day. The Nabua-Balatan variant can be easily recognized by the way they enunciate words or phrases when they talk or use the language. For being the mother town of all the municipalities and city in Rinconada area, the Nabua-Balatan variant is considered by linguistics as one of the foundation variants of Rinconada Bikol language.

Additionally, Spanish influences are frequently encountered in the languages of Nabuenos.  Some examples of Spanish words embedded in the local dialect are: “Abreyā raw iton puertan.” This is a command statement, meaning “Open the door” in English or “Buksan ang pintuan” in the Filipino language. The word “abreyā” is an inflection of the Spanish verb “abrir” (to open), and “puertan” is a shorten word of "puertāhan" which is from the Spanish word “puerta”.

Other variations of Spanish words being used in the Nabua-Balatan variant can be found, but many of these words or terms due to usage over time do not follow proper Spanish language conjugations and grammar.

Culture

Nabua has a rich array of customs and colorful practices that are found up to the present day.

Pangarana 

This is the Nabua version of “serenading”.  When a man wants to show his intent to court a woman, the man (sometimes accompanied by his friends) armed with a guitar or possibly a karaoke machine shows up on the woman’s doorsteps unannounced late at night.  The woman or her family have either the option to turn on the lights and acknowledge the serenaders or just ignore them.  In some cases, the event turns into an unforgettable event as the woman’s family may come up with some unique ways to get the serenaders out of their property, such as throwing a bucketful of hot water or unleashing “bantay”, the household watch dog.

Pa-aurora 

The local folks are religious in nature so it is common for them to make a religious promise or ‘panata’ expressing their exultation to God because of a bountiful harvest or they have a petition that they wish would be granted.  This is manifested through the local practice of “Aurora”.  On nine consecutive nights, they would decorate an improvised "carroza" for their local patron saint and then visit the households in the neighborhood with singing and prayers.

Pista sa mga Kalag 

On November 1, nearly all citizens take a trip down to the cemetery.  This is their practice of honoring and remembering departed loved ones. They would offer flowers and light candles in their tombstones, sarcophagus, or decorate the family mausoleum with flowers and food.  The local cemetery comes alive the night of November 1 to commemorate All Saints Day until the early morning of November 2 for All Souls Day.  Masses at the cemetery are often offered on both days.

Tang-gal kin Cuaresma 

During the season of Lent, some of the prominent families in Nabua will sponsor a “Tang-gal”. Tang-gal is the re-enactment of Jesus Christ’s Passion and Death on the cross.  After the passion of Christ is re-enacted, the “tang-gal” is concluded with “Ire-Helena”, the story of Helene and Constantine in search of the True Cross.

Pag-li-li 

When a family member or loved one dies, the family, friends and relatives of the dead offer nine days of prayers. This is the nine days of mourning where they go to the local church to attend Mass and then continue their novena prayers at the house of the deceased.  Prayers are offered to help the soul of the deceased rest in peace and at the same time to console the grieving family.

Katapusan 

After forty days of mourning, the family, friends and relatives of the dead celebrate the passage by hosting a feast and invite all those who consoled them in their time of grief.  Once everyone invited are gathered, they say the litanies and pray the Rosary of the Most Blessed Virgin Mary.  Local folks believe that the soul of their dead have now passed the stage of “roaming” and ready to rest in eternal peace.  This is the time to let go and as a symbolism, they can now wear other colors of clothing instead of the traditional all black or all white.

Dotoc 

Before the baranggay fiesta, "Dotoc" is a custom of Nabueños in honoring their patron saint through nine nights of thanksgiving.

Segunda Dia 

The day after fiesta. It is a dance extravaganza played with folk, country, and novelty songs that the married couples, widows, widower and senior citizens dance in a dance floor. This make more fun and recreation for them especially for the balikbayans, or overseas locals, that will remember the steps of Codot-codotan.

Economy

Primary Products 
Agriculture contributes a major role to the economy of the municipality of Nabua given its vast alluvial plains.  Its agricultural contribution consists of crop production, livestock, and fishery.  Crop production is more intense rather than livestock and fishery.

Rice production, both irrigated and non-irrigated occupies about 87.26% of the total agricultural land devoted to crop production while corn and other types of crops occupies merely 7.96% and 4.78% respectively.  However, crop production in the entire municipality represents only about 36.94% of the total municipal land area.  Livestock production can be described as one merely that of backyard raising style despite the presence of at least two farms located at Inapatan with aggregate of only 1.00 hectare and only 22,000 animal heads.  Likewise, inland fishing can hardly produce much-needed agricultural revenues both for the inland fishermen as well as for the benefit of the local government.

Trade 
The Poblacion of the municipality of Nabua is strategic area for commercial development.  Presently, its commercial area can be classified as a minor central business district which is reflective of being a tertiary urban growth corridor along the Legazpi-Iriga-Naga-Daet-Sorsogon growth corridor.  It services the commercial needs of the neighboring municipalities of Bato and Balatan secondary only to Iriga City.  Among the commercial establishments to be found within the Poblacion are wholesale trade, general merchandise, auto and motor supplies, school supplies, funeral parlor, groceries, insurance companies, banks, lending investors, pawnshops, drugstores, restaurant and sari-sari stores.

Several barangays outside of the Poblacion functions as neighborhood centers.  Those rural barangays include Santo Domingo, Malawag, La Purisima, La Opinion, Dolorosa and San Jose.  Most common in about 30 rural barangays are the mushrooming of sari-sari stores.

Industry 
The municipality of Nabua remains predominantly agriculturally-related in terms of industrial activities at present. The existing industrial establishment within Nabua consists mainly of rice mills with total industrial of about 3,000 square meters. Cottage industries generating household employment and income proliferate in rural barangays. Nabua has a potential for agro-industrial development. This is manifested by its: (1) proximity to both Balatan Port and Pantao Port (2) Inherent vast agricultural lands (3) As an urban growth center and, (4) suitable agro-industrial site.

Infrastructure

Health 
The municipality has Rural Health Units and hospitals nearby Poblacion area. Those are:

Rural Health Unit 1
Rural Health Unit 2
Don Henrico Uvero Hospital
Medical Mission Group Hospital (Rinconada Medical Center)
Clinica Figuracion
Carino Clinic
Recuenco Optical Clinic
Queen Hannah Birthing Clinic
Belen Lying-in Clinic
Tagomata Dental Clinic

Transportation

Transportation is very much important in Nabua because of its strategic location and membership in the Legazpi-Iriga-Naga-Daet growth corridor; and it is the preferred development strategy of agro-industrial commerce and tourism.

Land transportation available are the various road systems and the Philippine National Railways (PNR) track facilities traversing the municipalities. Generally, the municipality has adequate road lengths based on the standards of 1.5 km. per 100 hectares of arable land.

Utilities

The strategic location of Nabua along the Luzon grid makes it an ample recipient of power supply from NAPOCOR.  Within the municipality itself, the Camarines Sur Electric Cooperative (CASURECO) 3 as the exclusive provider retails supply of electricity.  All barangays within the municipality are already energized both in urban and rural barangays.

Water resources 
There are three existing Level 3 water supply systems that provide potable water, namely: Nabua Water District, Duran Water System, and Sagumay Water System.

Communication

Existing communication services and facilities includes cable television, telephone services, telegraph services and telegraphic transfer, cellphones, and postal services.

The only existing radio station in the municipality is DWEB FM 99.9 MHz of the Filipinas Broadcasting Company and the Bicol Media Network.

Tourism

The town of Nabua is known for having a large contingent of active and retired United States Navy servicemen. That makes Nabua a veritable destination for tourists, retirees, and balikbayans from the United States. Oftentimes, coyly and with a tinge of amusement, the town is usually referred to as the Town of the Green Bucks (U.S. Dollars).  Most of the families of these servicemen reside in Southern California, particularly in the San Diego area.  During religious and special holidays, these U.S. based Nabueños plus a growing number of Nabua natives now residing in other parts of the world would unfailingly return to their beloved Nabua, tagging along their friends, and freely spending their hard-earned foreign currency which definitely boosts the local economy and tourism.

Boa-Boahan Festival 
Nabua celebrates its fiesta with the now-famous annual Boa-Boahan Festival on the third of May. The highlight of the festival is the reenactment of the traditional "Boa Feast," a 13th-century rite where ancient Bicolanos offered chains of coconut embryos called boa to their pagan deities, in the belief that this would give them ample harvests, favorable weather, and make their lives more prosperous and happy throughout the year. The feast is enlivened with frenzied street theater, heart-pounding street dances and spectacles, and a riveting display of colorful and dazzling ethnic costumes. This annual festival was initiated and given unprecedented impetus and funding by then Mayor Ulpiano Duran and the town's first lady then, Mrs. Delia Duran, in tandem with the late District Supervisor Mrs. Patricia Romano and the principals, teachers, and pupils from both public and private schools.

The first-ever festival was held in 1975 and crowned as the first Binibining Nabua Alinsangan was Julie Sales Estadilla. The Boa-bowaan pageantry was graced in the evening by a memorable dramatic revue performed by the legendary U.P. Mobile Theater under Professor and National Artist Wilfrido Ma. Guerrero, with the help of the touring company's long-time national coordinator, Mr. Timothy O. Albano (incidentally, he and his staff volunteered to research extensively the legend and authentic lore behind the festival's underlying mythology).

The late U.S. Engr. Cleto Descalso, a Nabueño philanthropist who chose to retire in Nabua after the decades he spent working in the United States, generously funded the creation of the Descalso Garden Park near the Municipal Hall. This exquisitely-designed garden became the staging point for this first festival.  A poetry-reading featured during the first Miss Boa-Boahan/Alinsangan beauty pageant was delivered by National Artist Mr. Riyoh Alma (Virgilio Almario). The guests of honor who helped crown Miss Julie Sales Estadilla, the first Miss Boa-boahan Festival had included the commanding generals and commodores from both the Subic Bay Naval and Clark Air bases.

Holy Cross Parish 
The over 400-year-old church of Nabua known as the Vicariate of the Holy Cross is a prominent landmark along the national diversion road connecting the municipality of Baao directly to this town without passing the city of Iriga.

Lenten season 
Starting from Palm Sunday to Easter Sunday, you will find 400-year-old religious customs and traditions being celebrated by the locals. Semana Santa starts with the Palm Sunday procession and blessing of Palms. On Holy Wednesday and Good Friday, the Processions of 'Pasos' are solemnly held to depict the Passion of the Christ. To commemorate Christ's resurrection, the "Balo-balu" is celebrated the night of Black Saturday and then the "Ton-ton" at dawn on Easter Sunday after the "Salubong" procession.

Local industries 
Existing local industries such as bamboo craft, handloom weaving, woodcraft and basketry derived from available raw materials.

Education

Nabua boasts of a high literacy rate of 96.54% within the municipality. The people of Nabua put a premium on higher education as their key to social and economic mobility. The present level of educational services within the municipality covers a number of teachers and classrooms vis-a-vis current and projected enrollments.

For elementary level, there are a total of 33 elementary schools divided into East and West Districts with a total current enrollment of 11,947 pupils. The secondary level of education is currently provided by Nabua National High School, La Purisima National High School, Malawag Nationalized High School, Santo Domingo Institute, and Saint Jude Agro-Industrial College.

The Polytechnic State University of Bicol, formerly known as Camarines Sur Polytechnic Colleges, is a public school located in San Miguel that offers tertiary, post-graduate, as well as short–term courses, technical or vocational in nature.

Nabua is the site of large state-run and private educational institutions in Rinconada.  Some of the leading schools in Nabua are:

Notable personalities

 Gen. Ruben F. Bearis, Jr-  Former Chief Bureau of Fire Protection
 Atty. Noel G. Tijam - Former Supreme Court Associate Justice
 Christi Lynn A. McGarry - Filipino-American beauty queen finished 1st Runner-up in the Miss Intercontinental 2015 pageant
 Engr. Pedro Escuro - Philippine National Scientist who made significant contributions to rice breeding, as plant breeder, Professor, extension worker, and consultant in agricultural projects.
 Ruben Villaluz - Transliterator of the Local Government Code of the Philippines in Bicol Language
 Sofia Moran - Actress, Model, Recording Artist and Philanthropist
 Elizabeth Oropesa - Veteran actress and beauty queen
 Rizaldy Palenzuela - Stuntman under the production of Fernando Poe Jr.
 Beverly Llorente - Hollywood correspondent of ABS-CBN News
 Jorge Cariño - Journalist and news anchor of ABS-CBN News
 Mirus Emmanuel Ponon - Youth Leader and Global Teen leader Awardee
 Ofelia M. Samar-Sy — The First Female Summa Cum Laude of Bicol University and the Most Outstanding Physician in 2022. ￼

References

External links

Municipality of Nabua
Nabua Forum Non-profit Online Forum for Nabueno Communities Worldwide
Virtual Gallery - Town of Nabua
Town of Nabua Website
 [ Philippine Standard Geographic Code]
Philippine Census Information
www.camarinessur.gov.ph

Municipalities of Camarines Sur